Campus SuperStar is a Singaporean television music competition to find new singing talent. Contestants are students from secondary schools, junior colleges and institutes of technical education. The fourth season debuted on Y.E.S. 93.3FM on 3 January 2013, and began airing on MediaCorp Channel U on 18 February 2013 and ended on 31 March 2013.

Jim Lim and Xiaohan were the two judges from the previous season to return, and were joined by Y.E.S. 93.3FM radio personality Dennis Chew, who appeared as a judge for the first time. Previous judges Li Feihui and Ken Tay did not return. Previous season hosts Pornsak and Lee Teng returned to host the show.

Bonnie Loo, an 18-year-old student from Riverside Secondary School, was named the winner, and Gwendolyn Lee from Nan Chiau High School named as runner-up. This season marked the first time in Campus Superstar history both the winner and runner-up were females; Loo also became the series' first female winner, and she received a two-year MediaCorp management contract, a cash prize of $5,000, and the opportunity to perform with Mandopop singer Della Ding Dang in Glass Anatomy the Musical.

Judges and hosts
Jim Lim and Xiaohan were confirmed to be returning to the judging panel after judging season three of the show. Li Feihui was announced not to return for his fourth year as a judge, but would later appear in the grand finals as a guest judge. Ken Tay, who appear as a judge on the last season also did not return. It was announced that Y.E.S. 93.3FM radio personality Dennis Chew would replace Li and Tay on the judging panel as the third judge.

Season three hosts Pornsak and Lee Teng returned to host the show. Former season hosts Felicia Chin and Yuan Shuai did not return to host.

Selection process
The audition was opened to students studying in secondary schools, junior colleges or institutes of technical education in Singapore. Preliminary auditions were held online from 15 November to 9 December 2012. A group of online auditionees were handpicked and invited by the judges to attend the first round of closed-door judges auditions from 11 to 16 December 2012. Successful auditionees from the first judges auditions round advanced to the final round of judges auditions. Twelve finalists were chosen by the judges at the end of the final judges auditions round.

Finalists
Key:
 – Winner
 – Runner-up
 – Third place

* Lim originally represented Yio Chu Kang Secondary School in the competition before admitting to Saint Andrew's Junior College via the Joint Admissions Exercise.
* Yeo originally represented Raffles Girls' School (Secondary) in the competition before admitting directly to Raffles Institution via the Integrated Programme.

Live radio shows, print photo shoot and live television shows
Contrary to previous seasons, the competition was split into three stages: the live radio shows, print photo shoot and live television shows. The change in the competition format was to give all finalists an opportunity to gain exposure on radio, print and television. In another change to the format of previous years, all finalists are required to perform songs performed or composed by homegrown talents for the entire competition to showcase and promote local music. The Revival round, a round where singers perform to reinstate them from the competition, did not return this season.

The live radio shows started on 3 January 2013 and ended on 31 January 2013. The performance shows were held via Y.E.S. 93.3FM. Each week, three finalists performed on the first four weeks, with the voting lines opening before the performances. The results were based solely on the public votes. The results were announced on week five, with the contestant receiving the most public votes awarded with "鲜声夺人奖" sponsored by Tic Tac. The top three contestants based on judges' score were also announced, though the scores has no impact towards the overall results.

Guest judging role was brought in during the live radio shows. Y.E.S. 93.3FM radio personality Nico Chua was brought in as the guest judge.

The voting for print photo shoot started on 28 January 2013 and ended on 13 February 2013. Prior to the voting window, all finalists went through a full makeover by stylists from I-Weekly. Individual photos of finalists that were taken during the photo shoot were then uploaded to I-Weekly's Facebook page. Public votes, I-Weekly editorial team votes and Facebook photo likes, constituted 50%, 40% and 10% of the final results, respectively. The result was announced on 16 February 2013, during a meet-and-greet session at Alexandra Retail Centre; the singer with the highest combined total was awarded "最i上镜奖".

The live television shows started on 18 February 2013 and ended 31 March 2013. As with previous seasons, each live show had a different theme. Each week, the contestants perform on Monday at 8:00pm or Sunday at 8:30pm (live final), with the voting lines opening before the performances. The results are announced immediately after the performance shows at 9:00pm, with the contestants in the bottom two or the one with the lower combined total being announced and eliminated. For the top 12 performance shows, judges' score, public votes and scores accumulated from the live radio shows and print photo shoot, constituted 50%, 30%, 15% and 5% of the combined total, respectively. For top 8, top 6 and top 5 performance shows, judges' score constituted 70% of the combined total and the remaining 30% were determined by the public votes and gift-to-votes from the official website. Judges' score and public votes with gift-to-votes from the official website constituted 50% each to the combined total of the final.

The live television shows often featured guest performances. The first live television show included performance from Taiwanese girl group Popu Lady. There was no guest performer on the second live television show and footage from the audition rounds were shown instead. On the third live television show, British Singaporean singer Ming Bridges performed. Season one finalists Hong Yu Yang, Renfred Ng and Geraldine See performed on the fourth live television show, while SuperBand season two runner-up Da Feng Chui performed on the fifth. Mandopop singer Della Ding Dang, former Campus SuperStar judge Li Feihui and singer Eric Moo performed for the live final.

Guest judging roles were brought in during the live final. Music producer and composer Lee Wei Song, former judge Li Feihui and singer Eric Moo were brought in as the guest judges.

Results summary
Colour key

Live radio show details
Theme: Unplugged songs
Y.E.S. 93.3FM radio personality Nico Chua was brought in as the guest judge.

Print photo shoot details
Theme: No theme

Live television show details

Week 1 (18 February)
Theme: No theme
Musical guest: Popu Lady ("Lady First")

Week 2 (25 February)
Theme: No theme

Week 3 (4 March)
Theme: Their favourite local singers
Musical guest: Ming Bridges ("Under the Stars")

Week 4 (11 March)
Theme: Judges' choice
Musical guests: Hong Yu Yang, Renfred Ng and Geraldine See ("只对你有感觉")

Week 5 (18 March)
Theme: Their trump cards
Musical guest: Da Feng Chui ("相约每天")

Week 6: Final (25/31 March)
25 March (Prelude)
Group performance: "第一天" (all finalists except Yeo Min)
All top 12 finalists returned to the stage in this live non-elimination performance show. It featured group performances from the finalists as well as a look-back on their journey in the competition. Although Yeo Min, one of the top 12 finalists, was due to appear and perform, she was absent from the show as she was down with chickenpox.

31 March (Round 1)
Themes: Contestant duets: designated songs; contestant duets: love songs
Group performances: "By Now" (all finalists) and "别找我麻烦" (all finalists except Gwendolyn Lee, Leonard Lim, Lim Yong Hang and Bonnie Loo)
Musical guest: Della Ding Dang ("有你陪")
Music producer and composer Lee Wei Song, former judge Li Feihui and singer Eric Moo were brought in as the guest judges. Guest hosting roles were also brought in during the live final. Ben Yeo was brought in as the guest host.

 All performances featured backing vocals from Singaporean vocal band MICappella.

31 March (Round 2)
Themes: Oldies remakes; winner's song
Musical guests: Li Feihui and Eric Moo ("等你等到我心痛" and "你是我的唯一")

References

External links
 Official website

2013 Singaporean television seasons